Princess Tachibana no Nakatsu (? – fl. 539) was Empress of Japan as the consort of Emperor Senka.

Daughter of Emperor Ninken and Princess Kasuga no Ōiratsume. 

Gave birth to five children. 

Empress Dowager from 539.

Issue
, married to Emperor Kinmei
, married to Emperor Kinmei
, married to Emperor Kinmei

Child (died early, gender unknown)

Notes

Japanese empresses
Year of death missing
6th-century Japanese women
Japanese princesses